The Independent Party was a political party in Greece in the 1930s.

History
The party first contested national elections in 1933, winning two seats in the Hellenic Parliament with 2% of the vote. The party did not contest any further national elections.

References

Defunct political parties in Greece
Political parties established in the 1930s
Political parties with year of disestablishment missing
1930s establishments in Greece